The men's 90 kilograms (middleweight) competition at the 2010 Asian Games in Guangzhou was held on 14 November at the Huagong Gymnasium.

Schedule
All times are China Standard Time (UTC+08:00)

Results

Main bracket

Final

Top half

Bottom half

Repechage

References

Results

External links
Draw

M90
Judo at the Asian Games Men's Middleweight